Poétique du cerveau (English: Poetics of the Brain) is a 66-minute 2015 French-German-Israeli French-, Hebrew-, and Italian-language independent underground experimental documentary art film directed by Nurith Aviv.

Synopsis
Childhood photos from Nurith Aviv's family album evoke memories and reflections which lead her to encounters with researches in neuroscience. The film, released on DVD by Epicentre Films, weaves associative links between Aviv's personal biographical stories and interviews she conducts with neuroscientists about their work. These scientists, including Prof. Dr. Laurent Cohen, Prof. Dr. Yadin Dudai, and Prof. Dr. Vittorio Gallese, discuss topics partly related to Aviv's previous films: memory, bilingualism, reading, mirror-neurons, smell, and traces of experience.

Reception
The film, which includes music by Werner Hasler and was financed inter alia by Les Films d’ici, Angoa-Association of International Collective Management of Audiovisual Works, KTO, Conseil régional des Pays de la Loire, ZDF, Arte, Centre national du cinéma et de l’image animée, Procirep, Ministry of Culture and Sport's Israel Film Council, and Mifal HaPayis's, Ministry of Culture and Sport's Israel Film Council's, and Tel Aviv-Yafo Municipality's Yehoshua Rabinovich Foundation for the Arts, Tel Aviv, was screened at Les 3 Luxembourg in 2015 and 2016, at Centre Georges Pompidou in 2015, and at DocAviv, Tel Aviv Cinematheque, Arte, and Sderot Cinematheque’s  in 2016.

References

External links
Poétique du cerveau at Nurith Aviv’s official website 

 (Les Films d’ici Channel) 

2010s avant-garde and experimental films
2015 documentary films
2015 independent films
2015 films
Autobiographical documentary films
Documentary films about families
Documentary films about France
Documentary films about higher education
Documentary films about Israel
Documentary films about Italy
Documentary films about psychology
Documentary films about science
Documentary films about women
Documentary films about words and language
Films about scientists
Films directed by Nurith Aviv
Films set in France
Films set in Israel
Films set in Italy
Films shot in France
Films shot in Israel
Films shot in Italy
French avant-garde and experimental films
French documentary films
French independent films
2010s French-language films
German avant-garde and experimental films
German documentary films
German independent films
2010s Italian-language films
Israeli avant-garde and experimental films
Israeli documentary films
Israeli independent films
2010s Hebrew-language films
Self-reflexive films
2015 multilingual films
French multilingual films
German multilingual films
Israeli multilingual films
2010s French films
2010s German films